The Red River is a minor river in the North Island of New Zealand.

It feeds into the Ākitio River in the Manawatū-Whanganui region.

Rivers of Manawatū-Whanganui
Rivers of New Zealand